Judith Joy Schiemann Hahn (1941–1999) was an American artist. Hahn was born in Chicago, Illinois.

Her work is included in the collections of the Seattle Art Museum, the Art Institute of Chicago, the Smithsonian American Art Museum  and the Brooklyn Museum.

References

1941 births
1999 deaths
Artists from Chicago
20th-century American women artists